String Quartet No. 6 in G major "The Kids", Stiles 1.2.3.3 SQ6, by Alfred Hill bears dedication: "for the young fry at the New South Wales State Conservatorium of Music". It was most likely written for the student string quartet groups at the Conservatorium mentored by the composer. The manuscript is dated 3 September 1927. Its technical demands being limited, it is an accessible for amateurs composition. The quartet is set in earlier style, reminiscent of Haydn, Schubert, and other classical composers. With approximate duration of only 15–16 minutes, this is the shortest of all Hill's quartets.

Structure 
The quartet is in four movements.

I. Allegro (G major)
II. Scherzo. Allegro (E-flat major)
III. Adagio ma non troppo (C minor)
IV. Finale. Allegretto (G major)

Editions 
 Alfred Hill. String Quartet No.6 in G : The Kids Quartet. Narara: Stiles Music Publications, 2006 (pub. number S69-2006; ISMN 979-0-20029-72-6)

Recordings 
 (rec. 1994) Australian String Quartet (Hennessy, Lea, Crellin, Laurs) — (1997) Marco Polo 8.223746.
 (rec. 2007) Dominion String Quartet (Gezentsvey, Pucher, Maurice, Chickering) – (2008) Naxos Records 8.572097.

References

External links 
 Andrew D. McCredie. Booklet notes to Marco Polo 8.223746

String quartets by Alfred Hill
Compositions in G major
1927 compositions